Emma's uromys or Emma's giant rat (Uromys emmae) is a species of rodent in the family Muridae. It is only known from Owi Island, a small island of the size of about one square kilometer some 5km South of Biak Island, Indonesia.

References

Uromys
Mammals of Western New Guinea
Mammals described in 1994
Endemic fauna of the Biak–Numfoor rain forests
Taxa named by Colin Groves
Taxa named by Tim Flannery
Rodents of New Guinea